Harlingerode is a village in Germany and district of Bad Harzburg in the district of Goslar in Lower Saxony. As of 2020, Harlingerode had a population of 2,916.

Geography 
The Langenberg in the south is the most dominant landmark with its height of up to 304 m. The town is impenetrated by the Hurle, a tributary of the Oker.

History

Etymology 
The stem Harl- is derived from a settlor Herilo, which is ultimately rooted in a Proto-Germanic stem *harjaz meaning "army", still visible in German "Heer" and obsolete English "here". -ingerode is a locally widespread ending around the northern Harz region that served as a generic suffix for town names derived by any personal names (compare Göttingerode, Bettingerode).

Timeline 
Harlingerode was founded between the 9th and 10th century by the Saxon House of Billung. Harlingerode was first mentioned as Gut Heregeltingerode (Estate of Heregeltingerode) on June 3, 1053 in a deed of donatio by Henry III and as Herlingerode in 1181.

In June 1865, the Hansa Pit was opened south of the village on the outskirts of the Langenberg. It was under operation until August 1960, with a short shutdown between 1932 and 1935.

The village gained further importance during the 1930s when activities of mining industry were drastically increasing. The Harlingerode Zinc works was built in 1934, which made up the technologically most modern zinc mill in Germany up to the 70's. The demand of housing space owing to the immigration of mineworkers caused to rebuild the abandoned village Göttingerode south of the main town in the same year.

As an aftermath of World War II, the Harlingerode dramatically grew in population due to Flight and expulsion of Germans from 1944 to 1950, peaking at a population of 6,257 in 1950 including Göttingerode. Several construction projects were initiated to create living space from the 1950s to 1970s. Harlingerode was incorporated into the city of Bad Harzburg on July 1, 1972.

During the 1980s, the Bundesautobahn 36 was supposed to be constructed north of Harlingerode, which was later realised as the autobahn-like Bundesstraße 6. Thus, a land consolidation was executed between 1977 and 1983. The local rail station was taken out of service in 1983.

After a drastic decrease of profitability due to falling metal prices, said zinc mill dropped its main processing in 1970 and further secondary activities in 2000. Several succeeding companies of recycling and zinc oxide industry have settled down since the 1990s.

Infrastructure 
Harlingerode is located south of the highway-like built Bundesstraße 6 and the Bundesautobahn 369. Highway exits are Goslar-Oker to the west and Harlingerode to the east. Furthermore, Harlingerode is penetrated by the Oker–Bad Harzburg railway. Rural roads connect Harlingerode to Oker, Immenrode, Bettingerode, and Schlewecke.

Gallery

Literature 
 Alfred Breustedt: 950 Jahre Harlingerode. 1053–2003. (Village chronicle) Harlingerode 2003, .

References 

Goslar (district)
Bad Harzburg